Lassiter is an English family name. It is a habitational name from the city of Leicester (see Lester). Notable people with the surname include:

 Ariel Lassiter (born 1994), Costa Rican professional footballer
 Amanda Lassiter (born 1979), American women's professional basketball player
 Art Lassiter (1928–1994), American soul singer
 Bob Lassiter (1945–2006), American radio personality, known as "Mad Dog"
 Francis R. Lassiter (1866–1909), American representative, lawyer and military officer
 Ike Lassiter (1940–2015), American football defensive lineman
 Jack Lassiter, the chancellor at the University of Arkansas at Monticello
 James Lassiter, American film producer
 Kwamie Lassiter (1969-2019), American football player and coach
 Kwamie Lassiter II (born 1998), American football player
 Luther Lassiter (1918–1988), American pool player
 Marcio Lassiter (born 1987), Filipino-American professional basketball player
 Rhiannon Lassiter (born 1977), British children's book author
 Roy Lassiter (born 1969), American soccer player
 Seneca Lassiter (born 1977), American middle-distance runner
 Tyler Lassiter (born 1989), American soccer player
 Scott Lassiter (born 1987), American politician and educator

Fictional 

 Carlton Lassiter, fictional character in the American dramedy Psych, played by Timothy Omundson
 Connor Lassiter, fictional protagonist in the novel Unwind
 Hector Lassiter, fictional character in series of historical literary thrillers by Craig McDonald
 Jack Lassiter (Neighbours), fictional character from the Australian soap opera Neighbours, played by Alan Hopgood
 Lassiters Hotel, fictional location from the Australian soap opera Neighbours
 Jim Lassiter, fictional gunfighter and lead character in the novel Riders of the Purple Sage by Zane Grey, which has been adapted into five different film versions across the span of eight decades
 Major James Lassiter, fictional former Confederate army officer, main character in the film Rio Conchos (1964) based on the novel Guns of Rio Conchos (1958) by Clair Huffaker
 Owen Lassiter, fictional former President of the United States in the American TV drama The West Wing episode "The Stormy Present"
 Paul Lassiter, fictional character in the American sitcom Spin City, played by Richard Kind
 Lassiter, fictional character (fallen angel) in The Black Dagger Brotherhood series, by J.R. Ward.

Others 
 Dr. Wright L. Lassiter Jr. Early College High School, a high school in Dallas, Texas
 Lassiter (film), also known as The Magnificent Thief, 1984 adventure film
 Lassiter Coast, the portion of the east coast of the Antarctic Peninsula that extends from Cape Mackintosh to Cape Adam

See also 
 Lassiter House (disambiguation)
 Lester
 Lasseter (disambiguation)